Evel Knievel is a 2004 American drama film directed by John Badham and written by Jason Horwitch. The film stars George Eads, Jaime Pressly, Lance Henriksen, Fred Thompson, Beau Bridges, Matt Gordon and Peter MacNeill. The film premiered on TNT on July 30, 2004. The movie is well known for its many gaffes and inaccurate portrayal of Knievel and his career.

Plot
The film begins with Knievel preparing to jump the fountains at Caesars Palace in front of a large audience. A flashback to Butte, Montana in 1950,12 year old Bobby Knievel steals some hubcaps and then escapes on his bicycle before being caught and arrested. In 1958, while working for the Anaconda Mining Company, he observes the lung damage affecting the older miners and resolves to make a living performing motorcycle stunts instead. He meets Linda Bork, whose friends advise her to stay away from him. They marry and have two children as Knievel's reputation as a stunt rider grows.

Knievel makes a deal to jump the fountains at Caesars Palace on New Years Eve 1967 (subtitled with the incorrect date of 1968 and using Lynyrd Skynyrd's 1974 song, Call Me the Breeze). John Derek and his wife Linda Evans film the event. Knievel's assistant Bill tries to keep alcohol away from him but Knievel finds it and drinks some. He clears the fountains but tumbles off of his motorcycle from the force of the landing. He breaks many bones, including his pelvis, and falls into a coma. Linda stays with him at the hospital until he awakens. The doctors tell her that they have inserted metal rods to hold his bones in place and that Knievel will never be able to jump again but when he leaves the hospital he continues to tell the press that he will jump the Grand Canyon. Knievel fights with Linda over his desire to return to doing stunts.

In 1970, an employee of the Ideal Toy Company attends an event where he witnesses Evel Knievel get into a fight with bikers after one throws a tire iron at him. Knievel's fans attack the bikers and injure several. Recognizing his broad appeal, Ideal creates a line of Evel Knievel action figures. During a rafting trip, Knievel, his two sons, and his father-in-law John Bork fall out of the raft. Knievel is unable to reach John, who is carried away by the river and dies.

On August 20, 1974, at the Canadian National Exhibition, Knievel has his sons Kelly and Robbie ride as part of the performance. Unable to get a permit to jump the Grand Canyon, Knievel conducts test jumps over Snake River Canyon using rockets. The jump is broadcast on closed-circuit television on September 8, 1974, and Knievel gets into a fight with one of the reporters before the jump. He ultimately uses the Skycycle X-2 for the jump but the parachute deploys early and the drag prevents Knievel from reaching his intended landing spot. He instead crashes into the river bank at the bottom of the canyon but manages to survive. The public is dissatisfied and the media criticizes his effort.

In October 1975, Knievel performs his second stunt since the failed jump over Snake River Canyon. He jumps fourteen buses at Kings Island in Mason, Ohio to break his previous record. He retires from Jumping in 1980 and retires to Florida. The film ends with a compilation of footage of Knievel's jumps and crashes.

Cast

References

External links
 

2004 television films
2004 films
TNT Network original films
Films directed by John Badham
Films scored by Stewart Copeland
Films set in Montana
Films set in the Las Vegas Valley
Films set in Toronto
Films set in Ohio
Films set in the 1950s
Films set in the 1960s
Films set in the 1970s
2004 biographical drama films
American biographical drama films
Films about stunt performers
Drama films based on actual events
Cultural depictions of Evel Knievel
American drama television films
2000s English-language films
2000s American films